Claire Mitchell-Taverner  (born 17 June 1970) is an Australian field hockey player. She was born in Melbourne. She won a gold medal at the 2000 Summer Olympics in Sydney.

References

External links

1970 births
Living people
Field hockey players from Melbourne
Australian female field hockey players
Olympic field hockey players of Australia
Field hockey players at the 2000 Summer Olympics
Olympic gold medalists for Australia
Olympic medalists in field hockey
Medalists at the 2000 Summer Olympics
Commonwealth Games medallists in field hockey
Commonwealth Games gold medallists for Australia
Field hockey players at the 1998 Commonwealth Games
Recipients of the Medal of the Order of Australia
20th-century Australian women
Sportswomen from Victoria (Australia)
Medallists at the 1998 Commonwealth Games